The Steinhuder Meerbach is a  orographically right-hand tributary of the River Weser in the German federal state of Lower Saxony.

Names 
Some people simply call it Meerbach. Within the town of Nienburg the Meerbach is also commonly known as the Aue, and in the neighbouring villages to the south also as the Bäke.

Course 
The Steinhuder Meerbach is the natural tailstream of Lake Steinhude. Its channel flow significantly exceeds the inflow of above-ground headstreams of the lake. It leaves the lake at its northwestern end and then flows west through the Meerbruch nature reserve and the village of Rehburg. It then swings northwards and empties, after , into the Weser at Nienburg.

The Steinhuder Meerbach is canalised along almost its entire length.

At the point where the river bends sharply to the west in Nienburg shortly before its confluence with the Weser the Steinhuder Meerbach used to flow further to the northeast and discharge into the Aller at Rethem. Today the Schipsegraben ditch runs along the old river course.

See also
List of rivers of Lower Saxony

References

External links 
 Umwelt Niedersachsen – Flächenverzeichnis Weser (Lower Saxonian Environment: List of the subbasins of Weser basin
 NiedersachsenViewer: Steinhuder Meerbach
 NLWKN – Lower Saxonian environmental maps: Steinhuder Meerbach

Rivers of Lower Saxony
Steinhuder Meer
Rivers of Germany